This article details the fixtures and results of the Indonesia national football team in 2006.

Record

Managers of 2006

Goal scorers

Schedule
Merdeka Cup

Merdeka Cup

Merdeka Cup

2006
2006–07 in Indonesian football
Indonesia